Tongo-Tongo (Tóŋó-tòŋò) is a village and seat of the commune of Tédié in the Cercle of Douentza in the Mopti Region of southern-central Mali.

Tommo So is spoken in Tongo-Tongo. The local surname is Ouologuem.

References

Populated places in Mopti Region